Sanislău is a commune of 4,986 inhabitants situated in Satu Mare County, Romania. It is composed of three villages: Horea (Károlyipuszta), Marna Nouă (Újmárna) and Sanislău. Until 2004, it also included Ciumești, Berea, and Viișoara, but these were split off that year to form Ciumești commune.

It borders Hungary to the west, Petrești commune to the east, Ciumești to the north, and Pișcolt commune to the south.

The  is a  protected area located on the territory of Sanislău.

References

Communes in Satu Mare County